Ultrabeat: The Album is the début self-titled album by the British dance act Ultrabeat. It was released on 10 September 2007 (four years after their first single) with All Around the World records. The album was a major chart success in the UK Album Chart as it reached #8 in its first week.

Background
The long-anticipated album comes over four years after their first single "Pretty Green Eyes" was released. According to AATW, the album was delayed for so long because Ultrabeat kept producing new tracks and re-changing the album to accommodate the new material, and also going away to places such as Miami and Ibiza delayed the album as well. It was originally, supposed to be called Better than Life: The Album and was meant to be released around the same time as the "Better than Life" single. There was many speculation after this over whether an Ultrabeat album would materialise, until the summer of 2007 when AATW announced on their website that it was getting released in September 2007, and would include all their hits and more. Some of the tracks that never made it on to the album were songs called "Stay with Me", and Re-Con songs "Free Again" and "Let It Show".

Release

When the album was released, it charted at #8 in its first week and stayed in the Top 20 for a further three weeks, and the release of the album coincided with Ultrabeat supporting Cascada on their tour of the UK. The Album was released in Australia on 8 December 2007, with Central Station records, and in the UK, "I Wanna Touch You" was the next single released after the album, which came out at the start of 2008.

Track listing

Personnel
Ultrabeat
 Mike Di Scala – producer, vocals
 Ian Redman – additional producer
 Chris Henry – additional producer

Production
 Darren Styles – additional producer (on tracks 3 & 7)
 Wayne Donnelly – additional producer (on track 13)

Additional musicians
 Rebecca Rudd – vocals (on tracks 3, 5, 7 & 10)
 Darren Styles – keyboards (on tracks 3 & 7)

Other personnel
 Universal – distribution
 Absolute – marketing

Chart performance

Release history

References

External links
 Official artist profile (aatw.com)
 
 

2007 debut albums
All Around the World Productions albums
Ultrabeat albums